Thistle was the unsuccessful Scottish challenger of the seventh America's Cup in 1887 against American defender Volunteer.

Design

The cutter Thistle was designed by George Lennox Watson, with interiors by his brother Thomas Lennox Watson, and built at the D&W Henderson shipyard in Partick on the River Clyde and launched on 26 April 1887, for a syndicate of owners that included William Clark, John Clark, Andrew Coates, William Coates, James Coates, George Coates, J. Hilliard Bell, and William Bell of the Royal Clyde Yacht Club, and headed by James Bell. She was built of all-metal construction, with a teak deck. Thistle was skippered by John Barr.

Career

Thistle was built under conditions of great secrecy during the winter of 1886-7 and launched with her hull covered by a huge canvas. After winning or placing second in 13 of 15 Scottish regattas in her first year afloat, Thistle sailed to New York as the challenger in the 1887 America's Cup against the US defender, Volunteer. Skippered by John Barr, she lost both Cup races, and returned to Scotland in September 1887.  John Barr's younger brother Charlie Barr was also a crew member who, after emigrating to the United States, went on to achieve success skippering three consecutive successful America's Cup defenders.

Meteor

Following a few very successful years racing in Britain, Thistle was sold to the German emperor Wilhelm II (who otherwise used the SMY Hohenzollern) in 1891 for 90,000 gold marks and renamed Meteor. 
Between 1892 and 1895 Wilhelm II raced against the Britannia owned by his uncle the Prince of Wales later King Edward VII each year at the Cowes Week. Being a more experienced yachtsmen and having the faster ship Edward won all the races comfortably.

In 1895, Meteor was handed over to the German Navy in Wilhelmshaven as a school yacht and renamed Comet. In 1921, the vessel was broken up.

References

Notes

Bibliography

External links

G.L.Watson & Co. Ltd
America's Cup's Ac-clopaedia
The 19th-Century Yacht Photography of J.S. Johnston

America's Cup challengers
Individual sailing vessels
Royal and presidential yachts
Vessels of the Royal Yacht Squadron
Sailing ships of Scotland
History of Glasgow
1887 ships
1887 in Scotland
Ships built on the River Clyde
1887 in sports